Ama: A Story of the Atlantic Slave Trade is the debut historical novel by Manu Herbstein. It has been described as a work of faction that "successfully blends extensive and meticulous research with abundant imagination to transport the reader into the violent world of the Atlantic Slave Trade."

The book won the 2002 Commonwealth Writers' Prize for the Best First Book.

Publication history 
 2005, Picador Africa, 374 pages,  (print)
 2001, E-Reads, 456 pages,  (print on demand)

Reviews 
 Reviews are collected at www.ama.africatoday.com/reviews.htm.

References

External links 
 This contains primary and secondary texts relevant to the novel

Ghanaian novels
20th-century South African novels
Novels about slavery
Historical novels
2000 novels
2000 debut novels
Novels about American slavery